The 11th Division was a crack division of the Chinese National Revolutionary Army and part of the Chinese troops trained by the Germans. For a time known as the 18th Army, it served with distinction during the Second Sino-Japanese War. Being one of the five elite units of Chiang Kai-shek's Whampoa cliqué, the division ceased to exist after sustaining heavy casualties against the Communists in the Chinese Civil War.

See also
 New 1st Army

Divisions of the National Revolutionary Army
Second Sino-Japanese War